June Wandrey Mann (1920–2005) was a First Lieutenant in the U.S. Army Nurse Corps from Wautoma, Wisconsin.  She was the author of Bedpan Commando, an account of her military service in Africa, Sicily, Italy, France and Germany from 1942 to 1946, during which she was awarded eight battle stars.

Mann's book garnered significant public and media attention, leading to numerous television, radio and personal appearances, including on The Larry King Show, NBC Nightly News and Paul Harvey's The Rest of the Story, among others.

On June 22, 1995, Mann met with President Bill Clinton in Nettuno, Italy, as part of celebrations to commemorate the 50th anniversary of the Anzio beachhead invasion.

She was a life member of numerous veterans' associations, including the Disabled American Veterans, the Veterans of Foreign Wars, Anzio Beachhead Association, 36th Inf. Div., 3rd Inf. Div., and the 10th & 40th Combat Engineers.

She was also featured in the History Channel TV series World War 2 In High Definition. Amy Smart did the voice over for June Wandrey.

References
A letter from Wandrey referenced in PBS' "American Experience"
Several letters from Wandrey reprinted in Historynet.com's Oct. 2007 issue
June Wandrey -- "They Were There." (2010). The History Channel website. Retrieved 2:01, April 27, 2010.

1920 births
2005 deaths
20th-century American women writers
Military personnel from Wisconsin
Female United States Army nurses in World War II
People from Wautoma, Wisconsin
United States Army Nurse Corps officers
Writers from Wisconsin
American women non-fiction writers
20th-century American non-fiction writers
21st-century American women